Dicolectes clavareaui is a species of leaf beetle of the Democratic Republic of the Congo, first described by Heinrich Kuntzen in 1914.

References 

Eumolpinae
Beetles of the Democratic Republic of the Congo
Beetles described in 1914
Endemic fauna of the Democratic Republic of the Congo